Gustave Eiffel French School of Budapest (LFGEB), also known as the French School of Budapest (LFB) is a French international school in Budapest, Hungary. It serves levels early childhood (maternelle) through high school (lycée).

See also
 France–Hungary relations
 French people in Hungary

References

External links

 Gustave Eiffel French School of Budapest
  Gustave Eiffel French School of Budapest
  Gustave Eiffel French School of Budapest
 Gustave Eiffel French School of Budapest (Archive)

Budapest
International schools in Hungary
Schools in Budapest